Freddy Sahin-Scholl (born 21 December 1953 in Heilbronn as Freddy Scholl) is a German singer and composer.

Life and career
Freddy Sahin-Scholl is the son of a Turkish German mother and an African-American soldier. He was raised by a foster mother in Wüstenrot who recognized his musical talent. He worked as an anesthesia assistant. Sahin-Scholl lives and works in Karlsruhe.

At the age of forty he discovered that, despite his lack of vocal training, he is able to quickly change his voice from baritone to soprano.

On the 19 December 2010, he won the season 4 of Das Supertalent and 100,000€. He was in the running to represent Austria in the Eurovision Song Contest 2011.

Awards
1980: Award Baden-Württemberg (Category Cabaret)
2010: Das Supertalent (RTL)

References 

Galileo

External links
Das Supertalent RTL

1953 births
Musicians from Karlsruhe
German people of Turkish descent
German people of African-American descent
German male singers
Das Supertalent participants
Got Talent winners
Living people